In enzymology, a N-acetylornithine carbamoyltransferase is an enzyme that catalyzes the chemical reaction

carbamoyl phosphate + N2-acetyl-L-ornithine  phosphate + N-acetyl-L-citrulline

Thus, the two substrates of this enzyme are carbamoyl phosphate and N2-acetyl-L-ornithine, whereas its two products are phosphate and N-acetyl-L-citrulline.

This enzyme belongs to the family of transferases that transfer one-carbon groups, specifically the carboxy- and carbamoyltransferases. The systematic name of this enzyme class is carbamoyl-phosphate:N2-acetyl-L-ornithine carbamoyltransferase. Other names in common use include acetylornithine transcarbamylase, N-acetylornithine transcarbamylase, AOTC, and carbamoyl-phosphate:2-N-acetyl-L-ornithine carbamoyltransferase.

Structural studies

References

 

EC 2.1.3
Enzymes of known structure